The Somatic Symptom Disorder - B Criteria Scale (SSD-12)  is a brief self-report questionnaire used to assess the B criteria of DSM-5 somatic symptom disorder, i.e. the patients’ perceptions of their symptom-related thoughts, feelings, and behaviors.

The questionnaire 
The SSD-12 is composed of 12 items. Each of the three psychological sub-criteria of DSM-5 somatic symptom disorder (cognitive, affective, behavioral)  is measured by four items with all item scores ranging between 0 and 4 (0 = never, 1 = rarely, 2 = sometimes, 3 = often, 4 = very often). The order of the 12 items alternates between the three subcriteria (Subcriteria 1, 2, 3, 1, 2, 3…etc). Ratings are summed up to make a simple sum score (which can vary between 0 and 48 points).

Development 
The SSD-12 is a further development of the Somatic Symptoms Experiences Questionnaire. The 12 items of the SSD-12 were derived from a large initial item pool of 98 items via a mixture of qualitative (focus groups involving researchers and clinicians) and quantitative methods (psychometric analysis).

Psychometric properties 
Psychometric properties of the SSD-12 were examined in three different samples from Germany (psychosomatic outpatient clinic, n = 698; general population, n =2362; primary care, n = 501 ).

Reliability 
Internal consistency (Cronbach´s alpha) of the scale is demonstrated by Cronbach´s between α = .92 and α = .95.

Validity

Content validity 
The content validity is supposed to be high because the items are based on the DSM-5 criteria of somatic symptom disorder.

Construct validity 
The SSD-12 showed positive associations with somatic symptom burden, health anxiety, depression, and anxiety. Moreover, high SSD-12 scores were associated with poor self-reported general well-being and frequent health care use.

Factorial Validity 
The SSD-12 consists of a three-factorial structure which reflects the three psychological criteria interpreted as cognitive, affective and behavioural aspects of the DSM-5 B criteria of somatic symptom disorder.

Objectivity 
The instrument is straightforward to complete, has an easy scoring algorithm (addition of the responses), and is simple to interpret. There are gender and age specific norm values from the general population and cut-off values from a clinical sample. Given this, the objectivity of the instrument is supposed to be high.

Sensitivity to change 
In a German inpatient sample from a psychosomatic rehabilitation setting, Hüsing et al. 2018  showed that the SSD-12 is sensitive to change. A decrease of 3 points reflected a minimal clinically important difference.

Interpretation and normative data 
The provided norms enable researchers and clinicians to compare SSD-12 scores with reference values of a general population sample. In a clinical sample a cut-point of ⩾23 for the SSD-12 proved to be suitable to identify patients at risk for SSD

Combination of the SSS-8 or the PHQ-15 with the SSD-12 to detect DSM-5 somatic symptom disorder 
The SSD-12 can be used in combination with the Patient Health Questionnaire-15 (PHQ-15).  and the Somatic Symptom Scale-8 (SSS-8)  to identify persons at risk for SSD. Optimal combined cutpoints were ⩾9 for the PHQ-15 or SSS-8, and ⩾23 for the SSD-12 (sensitivity and specificity = 69% and 70%)

Translations 
The original SSD-12 was published in German and English. To date (July 2019), two official psychometrically validated and culturally adapted translations are available:
Dutch
Chinese

References

Further reading
Toussaint A, Murray A, Voigt K, Herzog A, Gierk B, Kroenke K, Rief W, Henningsen P, Löwe B. Development and Validation of the Somatic Symptom Disorder–B Criteria Scale (SSD-12). Psychosomatic Medicine. 2016;78:5-12.

External links
 SSD-12 questionnaire English Version (doc)

Somatic symptom disorders
Mental disorders screening and assessment tools